Naan Avanillai  is a 1974 Indian Tamil-language film starring Gemini Ganesan. Produced by Ganesan himself, it was directed by K. Balachander. It was adapted from the 1962 Marathi language play To Mee Navhech, written by Pralhad Keshav Atre. The film deals with a man who woos and marries several women while he takes on as many different identities.

Naan Avanillai was released on 7 June 1974. The film was commercially successful and received critical acclaim. Ganesan's won the Filmfare Award for Best Actor – Tamil. It was later remade into a 2007 Tamil film with the same title and a 2008 Kannada film titled Buddhivantha.

Plot 

Gemini Ganesan portrays a modern-day Don Juan who woos and marries several women while he takes on as many different identities. He is ultimately taken to court, but no-one is able to deduce his true identity as he speaks several languages with great facility. In the jail, the police inspector slaps him, believing he would utter something in his mother tongue when taken by surprise and this Indian exclaims in Chinese! In the final scene a man who maintains that the hero or villain is his brother Fernandez stabs him. Our Don Juan makes a sign of the cross before he dies.

Cast

Production 
Naan Avanillai was adapted from the 1962 Marathi play To Mee Navhech, written by Pralhad Keshav Atre. K. Balachander directed the film adaptation with Gemini Ganesan as the male lead. Ganesan also produced the film under his then newly inaugurated Shri Narayani Films, this being his only production. Kamal Haasan worked dance assistant in this film.

Soundtrack 
The music was composed by M. S. Viswanathan. The song "Radha Kaadhal" was recreated in the film's 2007 remake.

Release and reception 
Naan Avanillai was released on 7 June 1974. The film was dubbed Telugu-language as Srungara Leela and released on 17 December 1976. Naan Avanillai was commercially successful. The film and Ganesan's performance received critical acclaim. For his performance, Ganesan won the Filmfare Award for Best Tamil Actor. Kanthan of Kalki praised the cast performances and cinematography. Ganesan's daughter Rekha, despite her strained relationship with her father, praised his performance, saying, "You've acted well, daddy."

Legacy 
Naan Avanillai attained cult status in Tamil cinema for its witty dialogues, the screenplay and the "complete change of image" for Ganesan. Writing for Business Standard in 2011, Suveen K. Sinha called Naan Avanillai "arguably the most memorable film of his career". On Ganesan's centenary in 2020, The Hindu rated his performance in Naan Avanillai as one of his best.

Remakes 
Naan Avanillai was remade in the same language under same title in 2007. A Kannada remake, Buddhivantha, was released in 2008.

References

Bibliography

External links 
 

1970s Tamil-language films
1974 films
Films about fraud
Films directed by K. Balachander
Films scored by M. S. Viswanathan
Films with screenplays by K. Balachander
Indian black-and-white films
Indian films based on plays
Tamil films remade in other languages